Lunania polydactyla is a species of flowering plant in the family Salicaceaey. It is endemic to Jamaica.  It is threatened by habitat loss.

References

polydactyla
Vulnerable plants
Endemic flora of Jamaica
Taxonomy articles created by Polbot